The White Road Commander was a series of heavy-duty cab over trucks built by the White Motor Company from 1972 until 1983. After Volvo's takeover the Road Commander received a light facelift and continued to be sold as the White High Cabover.

Design
In 1975 the modernized Road Commander 2 was introduced, with a redesigned cabin using the new "tapered" doors seen across the White lineup and also on many  Autocar with the "2" version and other classic Autocar  and Western Star trucks kept the White classic cab, both brands also owned by White. The windshield remained split. Originally fitted with single round headlights, in the 1980s twin rectangular units also became available. The later White High Cabover was available as a WHS and WHL cab, these acronyms standing for "White High-cab Short" and "White High-cab Long". There were also WHE and WHM ("Extended" and "Medium"). After the White nameplate was combined with that of GMC in 1988 the design continued to be built as a White GMC.

Road Commander 2
The Road Commander 2 has a bolted frame made of high tensile steel, while the all-aluminum cabin is hydraulically tilted. This allows access to a wide range of available diesel engines from Cummins, Caterpillar, and other manufacturers. An unusual feature for the time was the RC2's pull-out drawer containing all electrical fuses and connections, located inside the cab. The RC2 was also marketed in many export markets and such models met all period EEC and ECE regulations. It was sold in several European markets such as Switzerland and the United Kingdom.

Western Star
Western Star had originally been created by White in 1967, specifically to target the west coast trucking markets. After White was purchased by Volvo in 1980, Western Star went its separate way — but the White-built cabovers continued to be available in Canada and in some western states with Western Star badging. The Western Star model never received the diagonal crossbar that other Volvo-built White trucks had. The Western Star Cabover also has a riveted on shield beneath the front windshield, helping to alter its appearance.

External links
 Western Star Cabover brochure

References

Road Commander
Trucks
Cab over vehicles
Vehicles introduced in 1972
Western Star trucks